Cold Harbour is a book by British writer Jack Higgins, set during World War II  and first published in 1990.

Plot summary
In May 1944 Brigadier general Dougal Munro of the SOE sends Genevieve Trevaunce, a beautiful British operative, to France with the task of infiltrating General Erwin Rommel's briefing on the defense of the Atlantic Wall. The mission is compromised and it is up to OSS Major Craig Osbourne, a highly trained assassin and Special Forces officer, to rescue her.

Release details
 1990, USA, G.P. Putnam's Sons, New York,

Reception
Reviews were mixed. Publishers Weekly called it "an improbable story", with "cardboard" characters and "nothing very new to offer", ultimately judging that Higgins' "reputation for entertaining thrillers [would] not be enhanced" by it. Kirkus Reviews similarly found its premise to be "(v)ery familiar", but with "twists and hurtling suspense enough to forgive its pure pulp roots."

References

1990 British novels
Novels by Jack Higgins
Secret histories
Novels set during World War II
Novels set in England
G. P. Putnam's Sons books